The Samagi Jana Balawegaya ("United People's Power") is a political alliance that is led by the opposition leader of Sri Lanka, Sajith Premadasa. The alliance was formed with the approval from the working committee of the United National Party (UNP) to contest the 2020 Sri Lankan parliamentary election. On 11 February 2020 the election commission of Sri Lanka announced that they have accepted the party as a recognised political party in Sri Lanka. Ranjith Mandumabandara was named as the General Secretary of the party. Jathika Hela Urumaya (JHU), Sri Lanka Muslim Congress (SLMC) and the Tamil Progressive Alliance (TPA) joined the new alliance on 12 February 2020.

Alliance won 54 seats and became the main opposition just 6 months after its formation. While the alliance traces its 'roots' back (primarily) to the liberal-conservative principles of the UNP, some members of the Sri Lankan media argued that the SJB has over time moved to the (progressive/democratic) political centre and even espouses several social democratic (centre-left) ideals.

Timeline

 30 January 2020 − The United National Party working committee approves Sajith Premadasa as leader of the new alliance and its Prime Ministerial candidate.
 11 February 2020 − The Election Commission accepts the appointment of Opposition Leader Sajith Premadasa as the leader of Samagi Jana Balawegaya and Ranjith Madduma Bandara as General Secretary.
 13 February 2020 − The Jathika Hela Urumaya, Sri Lanka Muslim Congress and the Tamil Progressive Alliance announce their support for the new alliance.
 19 February 2020 − The United National Party working committee approves of the swan as the symbol of a new UNP-led alliance.
 2 March 2020 − The SJB is officially launched at Nelum Pokuna Colombo.
 9 March 2020 − The SJB opens its headquarters at No 815, E.W. Perera Mawatha, Ethulkotte.
 10 March 2020 − SJB selects the telephone as its election symbol.
 19 March 2020 − The SJB hands in its nominations for 25 districts for 2020 General Elections, the party's first election.
 May 2020 − The Samagi Tharuna Balawegaya (youth wing) and Samagi Vanitha Balawegaya (women's wing) are launched.
 5 August 2020 − The SJB wins 54 seats at the 2020 elections to become the main opposition in Sri Lanka.
 20 August 2020 −  SJB leader Sajith Premadasa is appointed as the Leader of the Opposition.

Background
52 out of 77 United National Party members of parliament, led by Opposition Leader Sajith Premadasa, joined the new alliance. The working committee approved the name of Premadasa as the leader of the alliance and gave him the power to chair the nomination board for the 2020 upcoming general elections. On 14 February 2020, both Premadasa and Ranil Wickramasinghe agreed to contest the elections under the swan symbol and file nominations under Samagi Jana Balawegaya to avoid a division in the United National Party.

At the last moment, SJB withdrew from the agreement to contest under Swan symbol and the majority of the member signed nominations under the Telephone symbol. Approximately 75 members of parliament joined the alliance. A minority of the United National Party filed nominations under the Elephant symbol.

Other participants
The Jathika Hela Urumaya, Tamil Progressive Alliance, and Sri Lanka Muslim Congress agreed to join the new alliance on 12 February 2020.

Overview

Member parties
Jathika Hela Urumaya
Sri Lanka Muslim Congress
Tamil Progressive Alliance 
National Union of Workers
All Ceylon Makkal Congress
Democratic People's Front
Nawa Lanka Nidahas Pakshaya
Jathika Samagi Peramuna

Symbol
The SJB announced that a landline telephone would be its electoral symbol.

Wings
 Youth Wing − Samagi Tharuna Balawegaya  
 Women's Wing − Samagi Vanitha Balawegaya

Leadership

Party leader

Chairman
Sarath Fonseka (10 February 2020–present)

Secretary
Ranjith Madduma Bandara (10 February 2020–present)

Electoral history

Presidential

Parliamentary

References

 
2020 establishments in Sri Lanka
Political parties established in 2020
Political parties in Sri Lanka